Alfred Planas Moya (born 15 February 1996) is a Spanish footballer who plays for Marbella FC as a right winger.

Club career
Planas was born in Maresme, Barcelona, Catalonia, and represented Atlétic Sant Pol, CF Damm (two stints), FPE Calella, RCD Espanyol, CF Damm and Málaga CF as a youth. He made his senior debut with Málaga's reserve team on 24 September 2016, playing the last 15 minutes in a 5–0 Tercera División home rout of UD Dos Hermanas San Andrés.

Planas scored his first senior goal on 12 March 2017, the equalizer in a 2–2 away draw against Martos CD. On 13 July, he signed a one-year contract with UE Sant Andreu, also in the fourth division.

On 21 June 2018, Planas signed for CF Reus Deportiu and was initially assigned to the B team in the fourth division. He made his first-team debut on 19 August, starting in a 0–2 away loss against UD Las Palmas.

Planas scored his first professional goal on 15 September 2018, the only goal in an away defeat of CD Tenerife. In January 2019, as the club's financial situation worsened, he terminated his contract.

On 29 January 2019, Planas signed a two-and-a-half-year contract with AD Alcorcón, and was immediately loaned to fellow second division side Elche CF until June. On 12 July, he moved to Segunda División B side Valencia CF Mestalla also in a temporary deal.

On 17 August 2020, Planas agreed to a one-year deal with Marbella FC in division three, after terminating his contract with the Alfareros.

References

External links

1996 births
Living people
People from Maresme
Sportspeople from the Province of Barcelona
Spanish footballers
Footballers from Catalonia
Association football wingers
Segunda División players
Segunda División B players
Tercera División players
CF Damm players
Atlético Malagueño players
UE Sant Andreu footballers
CF Reus Deportiu players
AD Alcorcón footballers
Elche CF players
Valencia CF Mestalla footballers
Marbella FC players